Fancy Free is an Australian music variety television program that aired in 1961 on ABC.

The show was hosted by Peter Smith, and featured vocalist Penny Loveday, The Dominoes and Janet Keyte. Guests in the first episode included Gaynor Bunning, Johnny Bohan, and Tony Jenkins.

The weekly series aired on Fridays, with the final episode broadcast 6 October 1961, though ABC series of the 1950s and 1960s tended to have short seasons.

References

External links
 

1961 Australian television series debuts
1961 Australian television series endings
Australian Broadcasting Corporation original programming
Australian variety television shows
Black-and-white Australian television shows
English-language television shows
Australian live television series